Chełmno County is a unit of territorial administration and local government (powiat) in Kuyavian-Pomeranian Voivodeship, north-central Poland. It came into being on 1 January 1999, as a result of the Polish local government reforms adopted in 1998.

As of 2019 its total population is 52,018, out of which the population of Chełmno is 19,605 and the rural population is 32,413.

The county includes the protected area called Chełmno Landscape Park, which stretches along the right bank of the Vistula river.

Neighbouring counties
Chełmno County is bordered by Świecie County to the north, Grudziądz County and Wąbrzeźno County to the east, Toruń County to the south, and Bydgoszcz County to the south-west.

Administrative division
The county is subdivided into seven gminas (one urban and six rural). These are listed in the following table, in descending order of population.

References
 Polish official population figures 2019

 
Land counties of Kuyavian-Pomeranian Voivodeship